Wladimir von Pawlowski (29 August 1891 – 1961) was an Austrian lawyer and Nazi politician, who served as Gauleiter (Party Leader) and Reichsstatthalter (Reich Governor) of Carinthia after Austria was annexed by the Nazi Germany.

Pawlowski held these offices from 1 April 1940 to 27 November 1941. Before Anschluss he sat in the Carinthia landtag. He also was a member of the Schutzstaffel (SS) with an SS number of 292,801. On 21 June 1939, he was promoted to the rank of SS-Standartenführer.

References

1891 births
1961 deaths
Date of death unknown
Austrian politicians
Austrian Nazi lawyers
Gauleiters
SS-Standartenführer
Austrian nobility
Austrian people of Slavic descent
People from Spittal an der Drau